This is a list of the mammal species recorded in Israel. There are ninety-seven mammal species in Israel, of which one is critically endangered, four are endangered, eleven are vulnerable, and three are near threatened.

The following tags are used to highlight each species' conservation status as assessed by the International Union for Conservation of Nature:

Some species were assessed using an earlier set of criteria. Species assessed using this system have the following instead of near threatened and least concern categories:

Order: Hyracoidea (hyraxes) 

The hyraxes are any of four species of fairly small, thickset, herbivorous mammals in the order Hyracoidea. About the size of a domestic cat they are well-furred, with rounded bodies and a stumpy tail. They are native to Africa and the Middle East.

Family: Procaviidae (hyraxes)
Genus: Procavia
 Cape hyrax, P. capensis

Order: Sirenia (manatees and dugongs) 

Sirenia is an order of fully aquatic, herbivorous mammals that inhabit rivers, estuaries, coastal marine waters, swamps, and marine wetlands. All four species are endangered.
Family: Dugongidae
Genus: Dugong
Dugong, D. dugon

Order: Rodentia (rodents) 

Rodents make up the largest order of mammals, with over 40% of mammalian species. They have two incisors in the upper and lower jaw which grow continually and must be kept short by gnawing.

Suborder: Hystricomorpha
Family: Hystricidae (Old World porcupines)
Genus: Hystrix
 Indian crested porcupine, H. indica 
Suborder: Sciurognathi
Family: Sciuridae (squirrels)
Subfamily: Sciurinae
Tribe: Sciurini
Genus: Sciurus
 Caucasian squirrel, S. anomalus 
Subfamily: Xerinae
Tribe: Marmotini
Genus: Spermophilus
 Asia Minor ground squirrel, S. xanthoprymnus 
Family: Gliridae (dormice)
Subfamily: Leithiinae
Genus: Dryomys
 Forest dormouse, Dryomys nitedula LC
Genus: Eliomys
 Asian garden dormouse, E. melanurus LC
Family: Dipodidae (jerboas)
Subfamily: Dipodinae
Genus: Jaculus
 Greater Egyptian jerboa, J. orientalis LC
Subfamily: Allactaginae
Genus: Allactaga
 Euphrates jerboa, A. euphratica LC
Family: Spalacidae
Subfamily: Spalacinae
Genus: Nannospalax
 Palestine mole rat, N. ehrenbergi LC
Family: Cricetidae
Subfamily: Cricetinae
Genus: Cricetulus
 Grey dwarf hamster, Cricetulus migratorius LC
Genus: Mesocricetus
 Turkish hamster, Mesocricetus brandti LC
Subfamily: Arvicolinae
Genus: Arvicola
 Water vole, Arvicola terrestris LC
Genus: Chionomys
 Snow vole, Chionomys nivalis LC
Genus: Microtus
 Günther's vole, Microtus guentheri LC
 Persian vole, Microtus irani LC
Family: Muridae (mice, rats, voles, gerbils, hamsters, etc.)
Subfamily: Deomyinae
Genus: Acomys
 Cairo spiny mouse, Acomys cahirinus LC
 Golden spiny mouse, Acomys russatus LC
Subfamily: Gerbillinae
Genus: Gerbillus
 Anderson's gerbil, Gerbillus andersoni LC
 Wagner's gerbil, Gerbillus dasyurus LC
 Lesser Egyptian gerbil, Gerbillus gerbillus LC
 Pygmy gerbil, Gerbillus henleyi LC
 Balochistan gerbil, Gerbillus nanus LC
Genus: Meriones
 Sundevall's jird, Meriones crassus LC
 Buxton's jird, Meriones sacramenti EN
 Tristram's jird, Meriones tristrami LC
Genus: Psammomys
 Sand rat, Psammomys obesus LC
Genus: Sekeetamys
 Bushy-tailed jird, Sekeetamys calurus LC
Subfamily: Murinae
Genus: Apodemus
 Persian field mouse, Apodemus arianus LC
 Yellow-necked mouse, Apodemus flavicollis LC
 Mt Hermon field mouse, Apodemus hermonensis EN
 Broad-toothed field mouse, Apodemus mystacinus LC
Genus: Mus
 Macedonian mouse, Mus macedonicus LC
Genus: Nesokia
 Short-tailed bandicoot rat, Nesokia indica LC
Genus: Rattus
Brown rat, R. norvegicus  introduced
Family:  Echimyidae
 Subfamily: Echimyinae
 Tribe: Myocastorini
 Genus: Myocastor
Nutria or coypu, M. coypus  invasive

Order: Lagomorpha (lagomorphs) 

The lagomorphs comprise two families, Leporidae (hares and rabbits), and Ochotonidae (pikas). Though they can resemble rodents, and were classified as a superfamily in that order until the early 20th century, they have since been considered a separate order. They differ from rodents in a number of physical characteristics, such as having four incisors in the upper jaw rather than two.
Family: Leporidae (rabbits, hares)
Genus: Lepus
Cape hare, L. capensis 
European hare, L. europaeus

Order: Erinaceomorpha (hedgehogs and gymnures) 

The order Erinaceomorpha contains a single family, Erinaceidae, which comprise the hedgehogs and gymnures. The hedgehogs are easily recognised by their spines while gymnures look more like large rats.

Family: Erinaceidae (hedgehogs)
Subfamily: Erinaceinae
Genus: Erinaceus
 Southern white-breasted hedgehog, E. concolor 
Genus: Hemiechinus
 Long-eared hedgehog, H. auritus 
Genus: Paraechinus
 Desert hedgehog, P. aethiopicus

Order: Soricomorpha (shrews, moles, and solenodons) 

The "shrew-forms" are insectivorous mammals. Shrews and solenodons closely resemble mice, while moles are stout-bodied burrowers.
Family: Soricidae (shrews)
Subfamily: Crocidurinae
Genus: Crocidura
 Bicolored shrew, C. leucodon 
Lesser white-toothed shrew, C. suaveolens 
Genus: Suncus
 Etruscan shrew, S. etruscus

Order: Chiroptera (bats) 

The bats' most distinguishing feature is that their forelimbs are developed as wings, making them the only mammals capable of flight. Bat species account for about 20% of all mammals.
Family: Pteropodidae (flying foxes, Old World fruit bats)
Subfamily: Pteropodinae
Genus: Rousettus
 Egyptian fruit bat, R. aegyptiacus LC
Family: Vespertilionidae
Subfamily: Myotinae
Genus: Myotis
Lesser mouse-eared bat, M. blythii 
Long-fingered bat, M. capaccinii 
Geoffroy's bat, M. emarginatus 
Greater mouse-eared bat, M. myotis 
 Natterer's bat, M. nattereri
Subfamily: Vespertilioninae
Genus: Eptesicus
 Serotine bat, Eptesicus serotinus LR/lc
Genus: Hypsugo
 Desert pipistrelle, Hypsugo ariel DD
 Bodenheimer's pipistrelle, Hypsugo bodenheimeri LR/nt
 Savi's pipistrelle, Hypsugo savii
Genus: Nyctalus
 Common noctule, Nyctalus noctula
Genus: Pipistrellus
 Kuhl's pipistrelle, Pipistrellus kuhlii LC
 Common pipistrelle, Pipistrellus pipistrellus LC
 Rüppell's pipistrelle, Pipistrellus rueppelli LC
Genus: Plecotus
 Grey long-eared bat, Plecotus austriacus
Subfamily: Miniopterinae
Genus: Miniopterus
Common bent-wing bat, M. schreibersii 
Family: Rhinopomatidae
Genus: Rhinopoma
 Egyptian mouse-tailed bat, R. cystops 
 Lesser mouse-tailed bat, Rhinopoma hardwickei LC
Family: Molossidae
Genus: Tadarida
 European free-tailed bat, Tadarida teniotis
Family: Emballonuridae
Genus: Taphozous
 Naked-rumped tomb bat, Taphozous nudiventris LC
 Egyptian tomb bat, T. perforatus 
Family: Nycteridae
Genus: Nycteris
 Egyptian slit-faced bat, Nycteris thebaica LC
Family: Rhinolophidae
Subfamily: Rhinolophinae
Genus: Rhinolophus
Blasius's horseshoe bat, R. blasii 
 Geoffroy's horseshoe bat, Rhinolophus clivosus LC
 Mediterranean horseshoe bat, Rhinolophus euryale VU
 Greater horseshoe bat, Rhinolophus ferrumequinum LR/nt
 Lesser horseshoe bat, Rhinolophus hipposideros LC
 Mehely's horseshoe bat, Rhinolophus mehelyi VU
Subfamily: Hipposiderinae
Genus: Asellia
 Trident leaf-nosed bat, Asellia tridens LC

Order: Cetacea (whales) 

The order Cetacea includes whales, dolphins and porpoises. They are the mammals most fully adapted to aquatic life with a spindle-shaped nearly hairless body, protected by a thick layer of blubber, and forelimbs and tail modified to provide propulsion underwater.

Suborder: Mysticeti
Family: Balaenopteridae
Genus: Balaenoptera
 Common minke whale, B. acutorostrata LC 
 Bryde's whale, B. edeni DD
 Fin whale, B. physalus EN
Subfamily: Megapterinae
Genus: Megaptera
 Humpback whale, M. novaeangliae LC 
Suborder: Odontoceti
Family: Physeteridae
Genus: Physeter
 Sperm whale, Physeter macrocephalus VU
Family: Ziphidae
Genus: Ziphius
 Cuvier's beaked whale, Ziphius cavirostris LC
Genus: Mesoplodon
 Gervais' beaked whale, Mesoplodon europaeus DD
Superfamily: Platanistoidea
Family: Delphinidae (marine dolphins)
Genus: Tursiops
 Common bottlenose dolphin, Tursiops truncatus LC
Genus: Steno
 Rough-toothed dolphin, Steno bredanensis DD (once being considered as vagrants, but later confirmed as residential)
Genus: Stenella
 Striped dolphin, Stenella coeruleoalba DD
Genus: Sousa
 Indo-Pacific humpbacked dolphin, Sousa chinensis DD
Genus: Delphinus
 Short-beaked common dolphin, Delphinus delphis LC
Genus: Grampus
 Risso's dolphin, Grampus griseus LC
Genus: Orcinus
 Orca, Orcinus orca DD
Genus: Pseudorca
 False killer whale, Pseudorca crassidens DD
Genus: Globicephala
 Long-finned pilot whale, Globicephala melas DD

Order: Carnivora (carnivorans) 

There are over 260 species of carnivorans, the majority of which feed primarily on meat. They have a characteristic skull shape and dentition. 
Suborder: Feliformia
Family: Felidae (cats)
Subfamily: Felinae
Genus: Caracal
Caracal, C. caracal 
Genus: Felis
Jungle cat, F. chaus 
African wildcat, F. lybica 
Family: Herpestidae (mongooses)
Genus: Herpestes
 Egyptian mongoose, H. ichneumon 
Family: Hyaenidae (hyaenas)
Genus: Hyaena
 Striped hyena, H. hyaena 
Suborder: Caniformia
Family: Canidae (dogs, foxes)
Genus: Canis
Golden jackal, C. aureus 
Persian jackal, C. a. aureus 
Syrian jackal, C. a. syriacus
Gray wolf, C. lupus 
 Arabian wolf, C. l. arabs 
 Indian wolf, C. l. pallipes
Genus: Vulpes
 Blanford's fox, V. cana 
 Rüppell's fox, V. rueppellii 
 Red fox, V. vulpes 
Family: Mustelidae (mustelids)
Genus: Lutra
Eurasian otter, L. lutra 
Genus: Martes
Beech marten, M. foina 
Genus: Meles
Caucasian badger, M. canescens 
Genus: Mellivora
Honey badger, M. capensis 
Genus: Vormela
Marbled polecat, V. peregusna 
Family: Phocidae (earless seals)
Genus: Monachus
Mediterranean monk seal, M. monachus

Order: Perissodactyla (odd-toed ungulates) 
The odd-toed ungulates are browsing and grazing mammals. They are usually large to very large, and have relatively simple stomachs and a large middle toe.

Family: Equidae (horses etc.)
Genus: Equus
 African wild ass, E. africanus  introduced on Yotvata Hai-Bar Nature Reserve
 Onager, E. hemionus  reintroduced
 Syrian wild ass, E. h. hemippus 
 Turkmenian kulan, E. h. kulan   introduced
 Persian onager,  E. h. onager   introduced

Order: Artiodactyla (even-toed ungulates) 

The even-toed ungulates are ungulates whose weight is borne about equally by the third and fourth toes, rather than mostly or entirely by the third as in perissodactyls. There are about 220 artiodactyl species, including many that are of great economic importance to humans.
Family: Bovidae (cattle, antelope, sheep, goats)
Subfamily: Antilopinae
Genus: Gazella
 Arabian gazelle, G. arabica  
 Dorcas gazelle, G. dorcas  
 Mountain gazelle, G. gazella  
Subfamily: Caprinae
Genus: Capra
Nubian ibex, C. nubiana 
Subfamily: Hippotraginae
Genus: Addax
 Addax, A. nasomaculatus  introduced on Yotvata Hai-Bar Nature Reserve
Genus: Oryx
 Arabian oryx, O. leucoryx  reintroduced
Family: Cervidae (deer)
Subfamily: Cervinae
Genus: Dama
 Persian fallow deer, D. mesopotamica  reintroduced
Genus: Capreolus
Roe deer, C. capreolus  reintroduced 
Family: Suidae (boars)
Genus: Sus
Wild boar, S. scrofa

Locally extinct
The following species are locally extinct in the country:
Cheetah, Acinonyx jubatus
Red deer, Cervus elaphus
Sand cat, Felis margarita
Lion, Panthera leo
Leopard, Panthera pardus possibly locally extinct
Brown bear, Ursus arctos
Hartebeest, Alcelaphus buselaphus
Hippopotamus, Hippopotamus amphibius
Mediterranean monk seal, Monachus monachus 
Least weasel, Mustela nivalis
Golden hamster, Mesocricetus auratus

See also
Wildlife of Israel
List of chordate orders
Lists of mammals by region
Mammal classification

References

External links

Israel
Israel
'
mammals